Alaincourt is a commune in the department of Aisne in the Hauts-de-France region of northern France.

Geography
Alaincourt is located some 10 km south-east of Saint-Quentin and some 25 km north-west of Laon. The Motorway from Saint-Quentin – the E17 (A26) – passes directly through the commune heading south-east towards Reims – some 120 km to the south-east.  The motorway has no exit in the commune so it must be reached by the road D34 coming north-east from Moy-de-l'Aisne and continuing north-east to Berthenicourt. Apart from small country roads no other roads enter the commune. Alaincourt is the only village in the commune.

Apart from Alaincourt itself, which is quite large, the commune is entirely farmland. East of the village the commune is traversed by the Oise river and the Canal de la Sambre a l'Oise both waterways heading south more-or-less parallel to each other (the canal in a straight line) until the Oise joins the Aisne at Clairoix and continues as the Oise until it joins the Seine at Conflans-Sainte-Honorine in the north-west of Paris. There are a number of ponds and reservoirs near the Oise in the south-east of the commune. Apart from the Oise and a small stream also called the Oise there are no other watercourses in the commune.

Neighbouring communes and towns

Administration

List of successive mayors of Alaincourt

Demographics

Sites and monuments

The House of Marie-Jeanne, a collection of everyday objects
Multi-media Library

Notable people linked to the commune
Robert Louis Stevenson during his journey along the Oise.

See also
 Communes of the Aisne department

References

External links
Alaincourt official website 
Bells website 
40000 Bells website 
Alaincourt on Géoportail, National Geographic Institute (IGN) website 
Allincourt on the 1750 Cassini Map

Communes of Aisne